In popular psychology and analytical psychology, the inner child is an individual's childlike aspect. It includes what a person learned as a child, before puberty. The inner child is often conceived as a semi-independent subpersonality subordinate to the waking conscious mind. The term has therapeutic applications in counseling and health settings. The concept became known to a broader audience through books by John Bradshaw and others.

Origins
Psychologist Carl Gustav Jung (1875–1961) originated the concept in his divine child archetype. New Thought spiritual leader Emmet Fox (1886–1951) called it the "wonder child". The concept of the inner child was further developed by husband and wife team Vivian and Arthur Janov in primal therapy, expounded in the books The Primal Scream (1970) and The Feeling Child (1973).

One method of reparenting the inner child in therapy was originated by art therapist Lucia Capacchione in 1976 and documented in her book Recovery of Your Inner Child (1991). Using art therapy and journaling techniques, her method includes a "nurturing parent" and "protective parent" within "inner family work" to care for a person's physical, emotional, creative and spiritual needs (her definition of the inner child). It also posits a "critical parent within" and provides tools for managing it. Charles L. Whitfield dubbed the inner child the "child within" in his book Healing the Child Within: Discovery and Recovery for Adult Children of Dysfunctional Families (1987). Penny Park's book Rescuing the Inner Child (1990) provided a program for contacting and recovering the inner child.

In his television shows, and in books such as Homecoming: Reclaiming and Championing Your Inner Child (1990), John Bradshaw, a U.S. educator, pop psychology and self-help movement leader, used "inner child" to point to unresolved childhood experiences and the lingering dysfunctional effects of childhood dysfunction: the sum of mental-emotional memories stored in the sub-conscious from conception thru pre-puberty.

Further developments
Within the framework of psychosynthesis, the inner child is often characterized as a subpersonality or may also be seen as a central element surrounded by subpersonalities.

Internal Family Systems therapy (IFS therapy) posits that there is not just one inner child sub-personality, but many. IFS therapy calls wounded inner child sub-personalities "exiles" because they tend to be excluded from waking thought in order to avoid/defend against the pain carried in those memories. IFS therapy has a method that aims to gain safe access to a person's exiles, witnessing the stories of their origins in childhood, and healing them.

See also

 Ageplay
 Codependency
 Developmental needs meeting strategy
 Dysfunctional family
 Inner critic
 Jungian archetypes
 Personification

References

Analytical psychology
Popular psychology